Duncan McCuaig may refer to:

Duncan John McCuaig (1882-1960), Canadian Member of Parliament from Saskatchewan
Duncan Fletcher McCuaig (1889-1950), Canadian Member of Parliament from Ontario